Lithodoras dorsalis, the rock-bacu, is the only species in the genus Lithodoras of the catfish (order Siluriformes) family Doradidae. This species originates from the Amazon basin in Brazil and estuaries near Cayenne, French Guiana. These fish feed on the leaves of macrophytes. When the forests are flooded, they feed exclusively on fruits and seeds, acting as an agent of seed dispersal. Reproduction occurs once a year and juveniles are often seen in large numbers in the estuary of the Amazon.

References

Doradidae
Fish of South America
Fish of Brazil
Fish of the Amazon basin
Taxa named by Pieter Bleeker
Monotypic ray-finned fish genera
Catfish genera